Noxious Enjoyment was a French metalcore band formed in 1994. The members are ex-members of French rock groups - Daniel and Phil (guitar and bass, formerly of Lofofora), Kshoo (ex-vocalist for Dirty District) and Maya (drums, formerly of Sarkasein). Their sound is very similar to punk metal acts Sick of It All and Hatebreed and is a far cry away from Kshoo's former band, Dirty District. After their last album, Have a Nice Death, Noxious Enjoyment split up.

Discography 
Extending Perversion (2001)
Whore King Class (2002)
Have a Nice Death (2004)

External links 
Official website (archived) 

French punk rock groups